Jorge Uscanga Escobar (born 30 January 1944) is a Mexican politician affiliated with the Institutional Revolutionary Party. As of 2014 he served as Deputy of the LIX Legislature of the Mexican Congress representing Veracruz.

References

1944 births
Living people
Politicians from Veracruz
Institutional Revolutionary Party politicians
Universidad Veracruzana alumni
Deputies of the LIX Legislature of Mexico
Members of the Chamber of Deputies (Mexico) for Veracruz